Mill Rock Creek is a stream in Crawford and Iron counties in the U.S. state of Missouri. It is a tributary of Huzzah Creek.

The stream headwaters arise in the northwest corner of Iron County just north of Viburnum (at ) and the stream flows northwest to its confluence with Huzzah Creek in Crawford County (at ). Possum Trot Creek enters the Huzzah just upstream from Mill Rock Creek.

Mill Rock Creek was named for the fact the watercourse was the source of millstones.

See also
List of rivers of Missouri

References

Rivers of Crawford County, Missouri
Rivers of Iron County, Missouri
Rivers of Missouri